The following is a list of air force pilots of the Gulf War by number of aerial victories.

List of air-air victories

Claims

See also
 Air engagements of the Gulf War

Sources

Gulf War
Gulf War
Air-to-air combat operations and battles